Aušrinė Trebaitė (born 18 October 1988) is a Lithuanian former racing cyclist.

Major results

Road cycling 
Source: 

2004
 3rd Time trial, National Road Championships
2005
 2nd  Time trial, UEC European Junior Road Championships
2007
 3rd Time trial, National Road Championships
2008
 3rd Time trial, National Road Championships
 6th Time trial, UEC European Under-23 Road Championships
2009
 3rd Time trial, National Road Championships
2010
 1st  Road race, National Road Championships
 3rd  Road race, UEC European Under-23 Road Championships
 10th Overall Tour de Feminin-O cenu Českého Švýcarska
2011
 1st  Team time trial, Summer Universiade
 National Road Championships
1st  Time trial
3rd Road race
 2nd Overall Puchar Prezesa
2012
 3rd Time trial, National Road Championships
2014
 National Road Championships
1st  Time trial
1st  Road race
 7th Overall Tour of Adygeya
2015
 National Road Championships
1st  Time trial
3rd Road race
2016
 1st  Time trial, National Road Championships

Track cycling 

2009
 3rd  Team pursuit, 2009–10 UCI Track Cycling World Cup Classics, Cali
 3rd  Individual pursuit, UEC European Under-23 Track Championships
2010
 2nd  Scratch, 2009–10 UCI Track Cycling World Cup Classics, Beijing
 2nd  Team pursuit, UEC European Track Championships
2012
 UEC European Track Championships
1st  Team pursuit
1st  Omnium
2013
 1st Omnium, Panevėžys
2014
 1st Omnium, Athens Track Grand Prix
 Panevėžys
1st Omnium
2nd Points Race
 2nd Omnium, International Belgian Open
2015
 2nd Omnium, Panevėžys
 3rd  Omnium, UEC European Track Championships
 3rd Omnium, Grand Prix Minsk
2016
 1st  Scratch, UEC European Track Championships

References

External links
 
 
 

1988 births
Living people
Lithuanian female cyclists
Lithuanian track cyclists
Sportspeople from Panevėžys
Cyclists at the 2015 European Games
European Games competitors for Lithuania
Universiade medalists in cycling
Universiade gold medalists for Lithuania
Medalists at the 2011 Summer Universiade